David Kanter is an American former professional tennis player.

Raised in Kansas City, Kanter attended Shawnee Mission East High School and played collegiate tennis for Arizona State University from 1971 to 1974. A left-handed player, he reached a best singles world ranking of 326 and featured in the main draw of the 1975 US Open, where he was beaten in the first round by seventh-seed Tony Roche.

References

External links
 
 

Year of birth missing (living people)
Living people
American male tennis players
Arizona State Sun Devils men's tennis players
Tennis people from Kansas
Sportspeople from Kansas City, Kansas